David J. Klarich (born July 17, 1963) is a former American Republican politician and attorney who has served in the Missouri Senate and the Missouri House of Representatives.

Born in Hamilton, Ohio, Klarich graduated from University of Missouri with a bachelor's degree in biology and from Regent University with a master's degree in public policy and a Juris Doctor degree.  In 2002, Klarich resigned his seat in the state senate when he was appointed to the Missouri Labor and Industrial Relations Commission by Governor Bob Holden.

References

1963 births
20th-century American politicians
Republican Party members of the Missouri House of Representatives
Republican Party Missouri state senators
University of Missouri alumni
Regent University alumni
Living people
Politicians from Hamilton, Ohio